Susanne McCarthy (born 1949 in London, England) is an author of popular fiction with 25 romance novels in Mills & Boon from 1986 to 1999. Some of these are available for e-readers on the Mills & Boon website. Recently she has started writing again, publishing direct to e-readers through Amazon.

Susanne has travelled widely and lived in various parts of the UK. She now lives in Devon with her husband and two dogs. She has retired, but still does some work as a teacher in adult education. She also sings in a local choir.

Bibliography

Single novels
Chasing Stars (2015)
Summer Scandal (2015)
Christmas Secrets (2014)
Rogan's Game (2014)
A Long Way from Heaven (1986)
Don't Ask for Tomorrow (1987)
Too Much to Lose (1987)
Caught in a Dream (1988)
Love Is for the Lucky (1989)
Trial by Love (1989)
Tangled Threads (1990)
A Casual Affair (1990)
Dance for a Stranger (1991)
A Candle for the Devil (1991)
Second Chance for Love (1992)
Diamond Heart (1992)
Satan's Contract (1993)
Master of Deceit (1993)
Dangerous Entanglement (1994)
No Place for Love (1994)
Practised Deceiver (1995)
Forsaking All Others (1995)
Bad Influence (1996)
Her Personal Bodyguard (1997)
A Married Woman? (1997)
His Perfect Wife (1998)
Bride for Sale (1998)
The Millionaire's Child (1999)
Groom By Arrangement (1999)

Omnibus In Collaboration
Escape to Caribbean Kisses (2006) (Groom By Arrangement by Susanne McCarthy / The Children's Doctor by Joanna Neil)

References and sources
Susanne McCarthy's Webpage in Fantastic Fiction's Website

External links
Susanne McCarthy's website

English romantic fiction writers
1949 births
Living people